The San Bruno Education Foundation is a privately funded, non-profit charity 501(c)(3) based in San Bruno, California.

Mission statement

The San Bruno Education Foundation's official mission statement is:

References

External links
 

Educational foundations in the United States
Non-profit organizations based in California
Organizations established in 2005